ICI-118,551 is a selective β2 adrenergic receptor (adrenoreceptor) antagonist or beta blocker. ICI binds to the β2 subtype with at least 100 times greater affinity than β1 or β3, the two other known subtypes of the beta adrenoceptor. The compound was developed by Imperial Chemical Industries, which was acquired by AkzoNobel in 2008.

ICI-118,551 has no known therapeutic use in humans although it has been used widely in research to understand the action of the β2 adrenergic receptor, as few other specific antagonists for this receptor are known. ICI-118,551 has been used in pre-clinical studies using murine models.  When dissolved in saline, the compound crosses the blood–brain barrier. Common systemic doses used in rodent research are 0.5 or 1 mg/kg although efficacy has been demonstrated at doses as low as 0.0001 mg/kg (100 ng/kg) in rhesus monkeys. Doses up to 20 mg/kg have been used without toxicity. At room temperature in saline, the ICI 118,551 hydrochloride is soluble to at least 2.5 mg/mL.

References 

Secondary alcohols
Beta blockers
Indanes
Phenol ethers
Amines
Isopropylamino compounds